Mack Henry Mitchell (born August 16, 1952) is an American former defensive end who played five seasons in the National Football League, mainly for the Cleveland Browns.

He was born and raised in Diboll, Texas and attended Diboll High School and the University of Houston. He was drafted by the Cleveland Browns in the 1st round (5th overall) of the 1975 NFL Draft.

References

1952 births
Living people
American football defensive ends
Cleveland Browns players
Cincinnati Bengals players
Houston Cougars football players
People from Angelina County, Texas